Armillaria jezoensis is a species of mushroom in the family Physalacriaceae. Found in Japan, it was described as new to science in 1994.

See also 
 List of Armillaria species

References 

jezoensis
Fungal tree pathogens and diseases
Fungi described in 1994
Fungi of Asia